Grümpen may refer to:

Grümpen, Frankenblick, a district of the municipality Frankenblick, Thuringia, Germany
Grümpen (river), a river of Thuringia, Germany